Boce William Barlow Jr. (August 8, 1915– January 31, 2005) was first African-American judge in Connecticut, in 1957, and the first African-American to be elected to the Connecticut State Senate in 1966.

Born in Americus, Georgia, in 1915, Barlow came to Hartford with his parents when he was one year old, attended Hartford High School, and graduated from Howard University in 1939 as class president.  After serving in World War II in a segregated unit, he graduated from Harvard Law School, one of only four African Americans in his class. Like his father before him, he was active in Democratic Party politics, and won election to the state senate in 1966, serving two terms.  Barlow continued to distinguish himself, serving in a variety of state posts that advanced the cause of equal rights.

See also
 Boce W. Barlow Jr. House
 List of African-American jurists
 List of first minority male lawyers and judges in Connecticut

References

Howard University alumni
Harvard Law School alumni
Democratic Party Connecticut state senators
1915 births
2005 deaths
African-American judges
American judges
20th-century American politicians
20th-century American judges
20th-century African-American politicians
African-American men in politics
American military personnel of World War II